Neyland railway station was on the north bank of the Milford Haven Waterway in Pembrokeshire, Wales.

History
The Great Western Railway (GWR) was established under the vision of Isambard Kingdom Brunel, to link London to North America on the quickest possible route, with steamships landing passengers and goods in West Wales as opposed to steaming to an English port. Further, such a port link could also provide quicker access to Ireland.

Brunel, the GWR's Chief Engineer, originally proposed to situate the Welsh port at Fishguard, which was intended to be the terminus when the line was authorised in 1845. But in 1852, under extensive shareholder pressure to deliver revenue, Brunel changed his mind in favour of Neyland, because it was sheltered and had deep water to allow large ships to dock.

The SWR was opened in stages, and reached  on 2 January 1854; the last section from there to the new port was opened on 15 April 1856.

The western terminus of the SWR, a station originally named Milford Haven, was opened with the line on 15 April 1856. Very soon there was a twice-weekly steamboat service to Waterford. The station was renamed Neyland in February 1859, but was renamed again in November that year, becoming New Milford; it was shown as New Milford (Milford Haven) in some timetables.

On 1 September 1906, the station was again renamed Neyland. Neyland then rapidly declined in importance.

Goods facilities were withdrawn on 2 December 1963 and the station closed to passenger traffic on 15 June 1964.  The Pembrokeshire Light Railway Society was launched in 1986 in an unsuccessful attempt to re-open the section of the line from Johnston to Neyland.

Routes

References

External links
Neyland Station on navigable 1949 O.S. map

Disused railway stations in Pembrokeshire
Former Great Western Railway stations
Railway stations in Great Britain opened in 1856
Railway stations in Great Britain closed in 1964
South Wales Railway
Neyland